Nightflight is the third studio album by Australian singer-songwriter Kate Miller-Heidke, although her fourth overall. It was released on 13 April 2012 in Australia as both a standard single-disc edition and a deluxe two-disc edition.

Critical reception
Nightflight received positive reviews from critics. Jeff Jenkins of Stack.net gave the album 3.5 out of 4 Stars. Josh Donellan of Rave Magazine gave the album 3.5 out of 4 Stars as well, saying that it is "Pop music for clever people" and said that "Nightflight is clever, insightful and revealing" and that "[it] is a force to be reckoned with.". Iain Shedden of The Australian gave the album 4 out of 5 Stars. Brag Magazine gave the album 4 out of 5 stars, calling it a masterpiece. Noel Mengel of Brisbane's The Courier Mail gave the album 4.5 out of 5 stars.

Track listing

Charts and certifications

Weekly charts

Year-end charts

Release history

References

2012 albums
Kate Miller-Heidke albums